Václav Blažek (born 23 April 1959 in Sokolov, Czechoslovakia) is a Czech historical linguist. He is a professor at Masaryk University (Brno, Czech Republic) and also teaches at the University of West Bohemia (Pilsen, Czech Republic).

His major interests include Indo-European languages, Uralic languages, Altaic languages, Afroasiatic (Hamito-Semitic) languages, Nostratic languages, Dené–Caucasian languages, and mathematical linguistics (lexicostatistics and glottochronology).

In his book Numerals, Blažek discusses words for numerals in several language families of Eurasia and Africa (Indo-European, Uralic, Altaic, Kartvelian, Egyptian, Berber, Nubian, and Saharan), with briefer discussions of numerals in other languages around the world.

References

External links
Selection of Articles by Václav Blažek
Václav Blažek Bibliography

1959 births
Living people
People from Sokolov
Linguists from the Czech Republic
Czech educational theorists
Paleolinguists
Linguists of Nostratic languages
Linguists of Dené–Caucasian languages
Academic staff of Masaryk University
Academic staff of the University of West Bohemia
Long-range comparative linguists